Luis Francisco Tonelotto (born April 13, 1976 in Concepción del Uruguay, Entre Ríos) is an Argentine retired football striker.

Career

Tonelotto started his playing career in 1994 with San Lorenzo. In 1996, he moved down a division to play for Deportivo Italiano in the Argentine 2nd division. In 1998, he joined 2nd division Nueva Chicago and in 1999 he joined Almagro helping the club to secure promotion to the Argentine Primera.

In 2000 Tonelotto moved to Spain where he played for Real Murcia, in 2002  he played for Algeciras CF and in 2003: Avilés.

Tonelotto returned to Argentina and Almagro where he was the top scorer in the 2nd division and part of the squad that won promotion to the Argentine Primera. Tonelotto stayed with the club in the Primera, but they were relegated after the 2004-2005 season.

Tonelotto joined Universitario de Deportes of Peru in 2005 but soon returned to Argentina where he played for Chacarita Juniors before joining San Martín de San Juan in 2006. Tonelotto won promotion to the Argentine Primera for a third occasion in 2007. Tonelotto had a good Apertura 2007 scoring 8 goals and finishing as the club's top scorer. After two years with San Martín, he transferred to Independiente Rivadavia in July 2008.

Individual honours

External links
 Luis Tonelotto at Football-Lineups
  
 Luis Tonelotto at Futbol91.com 
 Luis Tonelotto at BDFA 
 

1976 births
Living people
Sportspeople from Entre Ríos Province
Argentine footballers
Association football forwards
San Lorenzo de Almagro footballers
Nueva Chicago footballers
Club Almagro players
Real Murcia players
Algeciras CF footballers
Club Universitario de Deportes footballers
Chacarita Juniors footballers
San Martín de San Juan footballers
Real Avilés CF footballers
Independiente Rivadavia footballers
Boca Unidos footballers
Argentine Primera División players
Argentine expatriate footballers
Argentine expatriate sportspeople in Spain
Expatriate footballers in Spain
Expatriate footballers in Peru